Rock & Brews is an American restaurant chain founded in 2012 by Paul Stanley and Gene Simmons of KISS and Michael Zislis, Dave Furano, and Dell Furano. The restaurant focuses on serving American cuisine comfort food, alongside the specific location's cuisine and community, while maintaining "a family-friendly concert environment."

History
The restaurant was first conceptualized over "a cold beer" during a casual brainstorming session with restaurateur Michael Zislis, business partners Dave and Dell Furano, and Paul Stanley and Gene Simmons.

References

External links

Restaurants established in 2012
Restaurant chains in the United States
2012 establishments in California
Companies based in El Segundo, California